1979 economic reform may refer to:
 The Chinese economic reform that started in 1979
 1979 Soviet economic reform